Bruce Mohr Powell Surtees (July 23, 1937 – February 23, 2012) was an American cinematographer, the son of Maydell and cinematographer Robert L. Surtees. He is best known for his extensive work on Clint Eastwood's films, mostly westerns of the 1970s and early 1980s. His cinematography was compared to that of the Dollars trilogy of Sergio Leone.

He began as a camera operator working on director Don Siegel's films with Eastwood during the late 1960s, his credits including Coogan's Bluff and Two Mules for Sister Sara. He became a main cinematographer in 1971 with The Beguiled, Play Misty for Me, and Dirty Harry in which he worked as director of photography.

Surtees was nominated for an Academy Award for his cinematography on Lenny (1974). He died in 2012 of complications from diabetes.

Filmography

1970s 

The Beguiled (1971)
Play Misty for Me (1971)
Dirty Harry (1971)
The Great Northfield Minnesota Raid (1972)
Conquest of the Planet of the Apes (1972)
Joe Kidd (1972)
High Plains Drifter (1973)
Blume in Love (1973)
The Outfit (1973)
Lenny (1974)
Night Moves (1975)
Sparkle (1976)
Leadbelly (1976)
The Outlaw Josey Wales (1976)
The Shootist (1976)
Three Warriors (1977)
Big Wednesday (1978)
Movie Movie (1978) (segment "Baxter's Beauties of 1933")
Escape from Alcatraz (1979)
Dreamer (1979)

1980s 

Inchon (1981)
Firefox (1982)
White Dog (1982)
Ladies and Gentlemen, The Fabulous Stains (1982)
Honkytonk Man (1982)
Bad Boys (1983) - with Donald E. Thorin
Risky Business (1983) - with Reynaldo Villalobos
Sudden Impact (1983)
Tightrope (1984)
Beverly Hills Cop (1984)
Pale Rider (1985)
Psycho III (1986)
Ratboy (1986)
Back to the Beach (1987)
License to Drive (1988)

1990s 

 Men Don't Leave (1990)
 Run (1991)
 Chains of Gold (1991)
 The Super (1991)
 That Night (1992)
 The Crush (1993)
 The Birds II: Land's End (1994)
 Corrina, Corrina (1994)
 The Stars Fell on Henrietta (1995)
 The Substitute (1996)
 Just a Little Harmless Sex (1998)
 Murder in a Small Town (1999)
 Dash and Lilly (1999)
 That Championship Season (1999)
 Lethal Vows (1999)
 The Lady in Question (1999)

2000s 

 Thin Air (2000)
 American Tragedy (2000)
 Joshua (2002)

Awards & nominations 
 Nominated for Academy Award for Best Cinematography: Lenny (1974)
 Nominated for Primetime Emmy Award for Outstanding Cinematography for a Limited Series or Movie: Dash and Lilly (1999)

References

External links
 

1937 births
2012 deaths
American cinematographers
Deaths from diabetes
People from Los Angeles